Mustafa Çeçenoğlu (born 12 January 1994) is a Turkish professional footballer who plays as a winger for Denizlispor.

Professional career
After starting his career in the amateur leagues of Turkey, Çeçenoğlu signed with Gençlerbirliği on 1 September 2020. Çeçenoğlu made his professional debut for Gençlerbirliği in a 1-0 Süper Lig win over Beşiktaş J.K. on 4 October 2020.

References

External links
 
 

1994 births
Living people
People from Kadıköy
Footballers from Istanbul
Turkish footballers
Gençlerbirliği S.K. footballers
Beylerbeyi S.K. footballers
Boluspor footballers
Denizlispor footballers
Süper Lig players
TFF First League players
TFF Second League players
Association football wingers